The Stavanger Oilers are a Norwegian ice hockey club based in Stavanger. They are members of the highest Norwegian ice hockey league, Eliteserien (known as GET-ligaen for sponsorship reasons). The Oilers were founded in 2000 by Hartti Kristola and other Finnish expatriate workers who wanted to play ice hockey at a professional level. After the demise of Viking IK in 1996 and the financial woes of successors Viking Hockey, the Oilers soon became the leading team in Stavanger. As of 2017, they have completed fourteen seasons in the Eliteserien, winning 359 regular season games and achieving nine top-three finishes.

Stavanger started out in the 2. divisjon (third tier) in 2001–02, earning successive promotions to the 1. divisjon and then Eliteserien over the next two years. They qualified for the playoffs in their first season in Eliteserien, losing out in the Semi-finals to would-be champions Storhamar. Since then, the Oilers have made the playoffs every season. In 2006, they advanced all the way to the Finals, but lost in four straight games to Vålerenga. In 2010, they met Vålerenga in the Finals again, this time winning 4–2 to claim their first Norwegian Championship title.

Seasons

Statistics correct as of 11 April 2017.

Notes
Code explanation; GP—Games Played, W—Wins, L—Losses, T—Tied games, OTW—Overtime/Shootout wins, OTL—Overtime/Shootout losses, GF—Goals For, GA—Goals Against, Pts—Points
Beginning with the 2002–03 season, all games in the Eliteserien have a winner. In addition, teams now receive three points for a win in regulation time, two points for a win in overtime and one point for a loss in overtime. This also applied to the qualifying rounds for the Eliteserien in 2003, but not the 2002–03 season of the 1. divisjon.
The Storhamar Dragons were deducted five points for use of an ineligible player during three games in November 2009, one of which was played against Stavanger. Stavanger, having originally lost the game in overtime, gained two extra points after the ruling.
Stavanger were deducted 3 points for using eligible player. Match between Stavanger and Vålerenga February 28, 2015, set to 0-0.
Totals as of the completion of the 2016–17 season.

References

Stavanger Oilers seasons, List of
Seasons